Bethel is an unincorporated community located in the town of Richfield, in Wood County, Wisconsin, United States.

Settlement
Bethel was established in 1899 as a Seventh-day Adventist education and religious community. Originally part of the Lyman Lumber Company land, and purchased through an offer provided by William Covert.

Educational Academy

Rooted as a religious educational institution, many families moved into the Bethel area seeking religious education for their students. The school was best known for its industrious education and manual arts. “The purpose of the academy from its foundation has been to give young people a broad symmetrical training for usefulness, and to lay a solid foundation for any work they may do in a more advanced school. The academy was located in a rural section removed from the contaminating influence of city life, where the teachers and students might devote a part of their time to agriculture and other industries,” as quoted from History of Wood County authored by George O. Jones.

The Bethel academy’s average student population was 130 students during the 1920s.

References

 

Populated places established in 1899
Unincorporated communities in Wisconsin
Unincorporated communities in Wood County, Wisconsin